Hit the Road Running, is a 1983 3D action comedy film starring Bill Gribble with Leon Rippy . This was the third of six 3-D films produced by the Owensby Studios in the early 1980s. The film had a very limited theatrical run. Music performed by David  Allen Coe.

Plot
Beau Jim Donner returns to his hometown to find unscrupulous tycoon Sam Grady has been buying out locals and intimidating any opposition to his plans. Donner joins as deputy and sets out to thwart Grady.

External links 
 

1983 3D films
1983 films
1983 comedy films
Films directed by Worth Keeter
1980s English-language films